Vitali Anatolievich Konyayev (May 11, 1937 in Kronstadt ) is a Soviet and Russian film and theater actor, People's Artist of Russia (1998).

Biography 
In 1958 he graduated from the Theater school Mikhail Shchepkin (class of Leonid Volkov).
Since 1958 he has been an actor in the troupe of the State academic Maly theatre.
In 1972–1982, he taught at the Theater school Shchepkin, including leading the teaching of stage fencing. He taught at Moscow state University and is now working as a teacher at the International Slavic Institute Derzhavin.

His debut film role Aleksey Gromov was in the movie Stokes in a Door (1958). He's best known for his work in the film Vladimir Basov Silence (1963).
He has been a Member of the Union of theatrical figures (since 1960) and the Union of cinematographers (1964). For solo concerts he has traveled all over Russia and about 30 countries (including America, Canada, Spain, France, Finland, Sweden).
For several years he headed the jury of the all-Russian theatre festival named Nikolai Rybakov in Tambov.

Personal life
His parents are Anatoli Mihaylovich Konyayev (born March 30, 1909) and Valentina Nikolaevna Konyaeva (born December 14, 1910).

He has a daughter, actress Elena Drobysheva (born 1964) with the People's Artist of the RSFSR 1985 actress Nina Drobysheva (born 1939). From his second marriage to Tatiana Stanislavskaya he has a son Dmitry (born 1987).

References

External links
 Rusakters.ru
 Under the cloak of Melpomene
 

1937 births
Living people
People from Kronstadt
Russian male film actors
Russian male stage actors
Soviet male film actors
Soviet male stage actors
20th-century Russian male actors
21st-century Russian male actors
People's Artists of Russia
Honored Artists of the RSFSR